Yodanoe is a genus of marine polychaete worms belonging to the family Polynoidae, the scaleworms. Yodanoe contains a single species, Yodanoe desbruyeresi which is known from the Clarion-Clipperton Fracture Zone in the equatorial East Pacific Ocean at a depth of almost 5000 m.

Description
Yodanoe desbruyeresi is a short-bodied scale worm with 17 segments and 8 pairs of elytra. The prostomium is bilobed and each lobe tapers to a rounded anterior projection. Lateral antennae are absent and the median antenna is located anteriorly in the middle of the prostomium. The neuropodium is elongate and tapering. The notochaetae taper to a point and have transverse rows of fine teeth. The neurochaetae are slightly flattened distally and have a row of serrations along each margin. The notochaetae are about as thick as the neurochaetae. All neurochaetae taper to simple points, none have bidentate tips.

References

Phyllodocida
Polychaete genera